State Route 48 (SR 48) is a north–south highway in Ohio that runs from SR 132 near Goshen to SR 66 near Houston, passing through Dayton.

Commemorative designations
On February 15, 2005, Governor Bob Taft signed Senate Bill 156, which designated SR 48 as the U.S.A.F. Pararescue Memorial Parkway. The route runs near the hometowns of four pararescuemen who were killed in action: William H. Pitsenbarger of Piqua, Sgt. Jim Locker of Sidney, Master Sgt. William McDaniel II of Greenville, and Airman 1st Class James Pleiman of Russia. Memorial markers are installed as far south as Goshen Township in Clermont County.

In 2010, SR 48 within the Loveland city limits was additionally designated as the Captain Seth Mitchell Memorial Highway. Mitchell, a U.S. Marine and Loveland resident, served in the War in Afghanistan and died in a helicopter crash in Helmand Province on October 26, 2009.

In 2016, SR 48 between Mason–Morrow–Millgrove Road (Warren County Road 38) and Interstate 71 in the village of South Lebanon was additionally designated as the SFC Bobby Lee Estle Memorial Highway. Estle, a U.S. Army sergeant first class who was born and raised in Ohio, was a 1991 graduate of Lebanon High School in which he was in the Junior ROTC, and attended the Warren County Career Center. He served in support of Operation Enduring Freedom in the War in Afghanistan and was killed in action in 2012 at the age of 38, ten days before he was due to return home. Throughout his 18-year career in the Army, Estle served two tours in Iraq and two tours in Afghanistan.

In 2020, SR 48 (Far Hills Avenue) between Stroop Road and Dorothy Lane in Kettering was additionally designated as the CWO3 James E. Groves III Memorial Highway. Groves, a U.S. Army chief warrant officer three and instructor pilot, was a Columbus native who moved to Kettering as a child and graduated from that city's Fairmont High School in 1994. Serving in the War in Afghanistan, he was killed at the age of 37 on March 16, 2013, when the helicopter he was piloting crashed due to suspected mechanical failure near Kandahar; another soldier aboard survived the crash. Enlisting in the Army after high school commencement, Groves had served two tours in Iraq and was near the end of his second tour in Afghanistan. Approaching his 19th anniversary in the Army, Groves had planned to retire after a 20-year career.

History
In the early 20th century, SR 48 was assigned to completely unrelated routes within the state. From 1923 to 1927, it was the designation given to Barnesville–Hendrysburg, Barnesville–Woodsfield, and Woodsfield–Sistersville roads in eastern Ohio, now designated SR 800. Present-day SR 48 was previously signed as SR 50, and before that as Dayton–Covington and Dayton–Lebanon roads. (See 1923 Ohio state highway renumbering and 1927 Ohio state highway renumbering).

Future
In 2021, the Ohio Department of Transportation (ODOT) awarded the city of Dayton $4.74 million to place SR 48 (North Main Street) on a "road diet". Dayton, ODOT District 7 and the Miami Valley Regional Planning Commission had hired the engineering firm Burgess & Niple to study the roadway from Great Miami Boulevard in Dayton north to Shiloh Springs Road in Harrison Township, Montgomery County. That section of the street, with some of the most dangerous intersections in the region, from 2015 to 2017, had 900 crashes, 356 of those with injuries and seven with fatalities. The proposed road diet involves converting the roadway from two lanes in each direction to one lane in each direction, with a center turn lane. Curbs are to be extended, allowing for the addition of on-street parking. Also there is to be new lighting and for pedestrians, new signals and refuge islands with improved sidewalks and crosswalks. In addition the plan calls for softening a sharp curve at one of the intersections along the street. Design and review is expected to last through 2022, with right-of-way acquisition in 2023, and construction to begin in summer 2024.

Major intersections

In popular culture
In I Love Lucy episode #111, "First Stop", the Ricardos and the Mertzes travel this route, although they were headed to Cincinnati.

SR 48-T

State Route 48 Temporary (SR 48-T, also called Future SR 48 and Bypass 48) is a  partial bypass of Lebanon running from the SR 48 / SR 123 interchange to an intersection of US 42 and Miller Road. The four-lane divided roadway is a northern continuation of a divided highway segment of SR 48. The route was created by 1971 when a high-speed bypass of Lebanon was created. SR 48-T is not signed as such; the northbound direction is signed as "To US 42 north" and the southbound direction is signed as "To SR 48 south."

References

External links

Highways of the State of Ohio: Ohio State Route 48, Montgomery County, Bill Burmaster

048
Transportation in Clermont County, Ohio
Transportation in Warren County, Ohio
Transportation in Montgomery County, Ohio
Transportation in Dayton, Ohio
Transportation in Miami County, Ohio
Transportation in Shelby County, Ohio